Gary Steven Twynham (born 8 February 1976) is an English former footballer who played as a midfielder for Darlington and Macclesfield Town in the Football League.

References

External links

1976 births
Living people
English footballers
Association football midfielders
Manchester United F.C. players
Darlington F.C. players
Gateshead F.C. players
Grantham Town F.C. players
Lincoln City F.C. players
Hednesford Town F.C. players
Macclesfield Town F.C. players
Haverfordwest County A.F.C. players
Port Talbot Town F.C. players
Colwyn Bay F.C. players
Barry Town United F.C. players
National League (English football) players